Nissim Sharim Paz (20 July 1932 – 5 November 2020) was a Chilean actor and theater director. He was the director of Teatro Ictus company from 1962 to 2015, and is also known for having participated both in the TV show La Manivela and for a famous Banco Estado publicity together with Delfina Guzmán. He was also a prominent opponent of the Chilean military dictatorship.

Biography 
Nissim Sharim Paz was born in Santiago de Chile on July 20, 1932, son of Elías Sharim, a man from Lebanese descent and Fortuna Paz, a woman from Egypt descent, he was the youngest of four brothers, besides, it was from Jewish descent. Later, he studied law and theater for five years at the Law School of the University of Chile, after graduating as a lawyer in 1957, the next day, he married Argentine psychologist Juana Kovalskys, had two daughters: psychologist Dariela and actress Paula Sharim. Although he graduated, he soon devoted himself to the theater, starting his acting career in 1962, when he entered at the Ictus Theater, a company he directed until 2015.

In 1979 he directed the play "Nice country corner with sea view", he participated as protagonist in the television program "La Manivela" and in films such as "¡Ufa con el sexo!" (1968), "Musica y palabras" (1978), "Julio comienza en julio" (1979). in the 80s he starred together with the actress Delfina Guzmán the commercial "Comprate un auto Perico" (Buy a car Perico). He was also a prominent opponent of the military dictatorship, what I provoked from harassment, persecution and even death threats. After the return of democracy, they chose it as part of the board of Televisión Nacional de Chile (TVN) for four years, in politics, he was part of the central leadership of the Partido por la democracia (PPD) in 1989, being one of its members, he was also a columnist for Diario Siete and a board member of Televisión Nacional de Chile from 2000 to 2004. 

In 2008 he published his first and only book entitled "Espera larga" (Long wait), in 2015, at 85 years old and after 53 years at the helm of the company, he left the direction of the theater company in the hands of his daughter, Paula Sharim, due to health problems. In 2016 the Ictus theater company awarded Sharim the "Rene Cassin Human Rights Award", in 2019 during the International Holocaust Day ceremony, he received the «Luz y Memoria» (Light and Memory) award, he also argued that the memories of the Holocaust should not be forgotten, since "they are a reminder so that history does not repeat itself."

Death 
Nissim Sharim died at 5:50 a.m. on Thursday, November 5, 2020, before the death, the Ictus theater company declared that: «As Ictus theater, its home for more than 60 years, we hope that it carries with it the recognition of an entire country that witnessed the resistance and struggle that gave through theater, he looked closely at his absolute dedication to the performing arts.» In addition, his wake was held from 12 a.m. to 4 p.m. in the room known as La Comedia del Teatro Ictus, located at Merced 349 in the Lastarria neighborhood, in the words of Nissim Sharim before his death:

Filmography

Films 
 ¡Ufa con el sexo! (1968)
 Música y palabras (1978)
 Julio comienza en julio (1979)
 Historia de un Roble Solo (1982)
 Sexto A 1965 (1985)
 El incontrolable mundo del azar (2012)
 La Candelaria (2017)

Television 
La Manivela (1970)
Familia moderna (2015) 
Veinteañero a los 40 (2016)

References 

1932 births
2020 deaths
Chilean film actors
Chilean male actors
People from Santiago
Actors from Santiago
Chilean theatre directors
Chilean television actors
20th-century Chilean actors
21st-century Chilean actors
Chilean Jews
Chilean actor-politicians
Chilean people of Lebanese descent
People of Lebanese-Jewish descent

People of Egyptian-Jewish descent